Puerto Francisco de Orellana, also known as El Coca, is the capital of province of Orellana in eastern Ecuador. The city is located in the Amazon Rainforest at the confluence of the Coca River and the Napo River (the smaller Payamino River also merges into the Napo in the city). It has a population of 45,163 inhabitants as of 2010. It is visited by tourists going into the Amazonian forest and is served by the Francisco de Orellana Airport.

Overview
The city is named for Francisco de Orellana, who explored the confluence of the Coca River and the Napo River. It is believed that he set sail from the current location of the town eventually making his way into the Amazon River seeing the "Amazon" or tribes in which the women also fought.  Eventually Francisco de Orellana made it to the Atlantic. He made a second expedition leaving but died on the Amazon delta unable to find a way through.

Government
The new mayor of the town was Antonio Vera in 2019 to replace Anita Rivas who had served since 2005.

Climate
Puerto Francisco de Orellano has a tropical rainforest climate (Af) with heavy rainfall year-round.

References

External links
 Official website 
 Official tourism website of El Coca 
 

Populated places in Orellana Province
Provincial capitals in Ecuador